Discosphaera tubifer (original name: Discosphaera tubifera) is a marine, unicellular species of coccolithophore in the genus Discosphaera. It exhibits a very delicate structure and arrangement of coccoliths.

References

Haptophyte species